The 1935 Miami Redskins football team was an American football team that represented Miami University as a member of the Buckeye Athletic Association (BAA) during the 1935 college football season. In its fourth season under head coach Frank Wilton, Miami compiled a 5–3–1 record (1–3–1 against conference opponents) and finished in fifth place out of six teams in the BAA.

Schedule

References

Miami
Miami RedHawks football seasons
Miami Redskins football